The Vineyard is a 1989 American horror film directed by James Hong and William Rice, written by Hong, Douglas Kondo, James Marlowe and Harry Mok, and starring Hong, Michael Wong, Sherri Ball and Playboy Playmate Karen Witter.

Plot
Winemaker Dr. Elson Po fears that he is getting too old, so he kidnaps people and uses their blood to make his world-famous wine. Asking his god for eternal life, he drinks his wine and becomes young again. A group of young actors come to his mansion to audition for his purported "wine-making film" but the seven guests soon find out the secret of his wine and must escape.

Cast
 James Hong as Dr. Elson Po
 Michael Wong as Jeremy Young
 Sherri Ball as Celeste
 Karl Heinz Teuber as Paul Edmonds
 Karen Witter as Jezebel
 Sean P. Donahue as Brian Whiteman

Release
The Vineyard was given a limited release theatrically in the United States by New World Pictures in 1989. The film was later released on DVD in the U.S. by Anchor Bay Entertainment in 2001 and Image Entertainment in 2011, and was issued in the UK by Arrow Films in 2013.

On September 24, 2019, The Vineyard was given its first ever Blu-ray release (as a combo pack with a DVD) by Vinegar Syndrome, with the first 2,000 units featuring a limited edition embossed slipcover. The film was presented in a 4K restoration from the original camera negative, and bonus features included three interviews, the theatrical trailer and reversible cover artwork.

Reception
Paul Risker of Starburst rated it 6/10 stars and wrote, "So long as you don't expect too much from it, The Vineyard is good fun, a nonsensical romp on an isolated island with plenty of cult moments to satisfy certain cravings."  Food & Wine called it "the greatest wine-centric B horror film".

Writing in The Zombie Movie Encyclopedia, academic Peter Dendle wrote that the film's East Asian mythology helps to distinguish it, but it "falls into the usual late-'80s horror ruts, preferring isolated shocks to any gradual build-up of mood".

References

External links
 

1989 films
1989 horror films
American zombie films
American independent films
Films about wine
1980s English-language films
1980s American films